National Mall and Memorial Parks (formerly known as National Capital Parks-Central) is an administrative unit of the National Park Service (NPS) encompassing many national memorials and other areas in Washington, D.C. Federally owned and administered parks in the capital area date back to 1790, some of the oldest in the United States. In 1933, they were transferred to the control of the National Park Service. These parks were known as the National Capital Parks from their inception until 1965. The NPS now operates multiple park groupings in the D.C. area, including National Capital Parks-East, Rock Creek Park, President's Park, and George Washington Memorial Parkway. National Mall and Memorial Parks also provides technical assistance for the United States Navy Memorial.

List of parks, memorials and monuments

Official units administered

 Belmont-Paul Women's Equality National Monument
 Constitution Gardens
 Ford's Theatre National Historic Site, including Petersen House
 Franklin Delano Roosevelt Memorial
 Korean War Veterans Memorial
 Lincoln Memorial
 Martin Luther King Jr. Memorial
 National Mall
 Pennsylvania Avenue National Historic Site and Park
 Thomas Jefferson Memorial
 Vietnam Veterans Memorial
 Washington Monument
 National World War I Memorial
 National World War II Memorial

Other squares, circles, triangles, memorials, and parks
Source:

 African American Civil War Memorial
 Albert Einstein Memorial
 American Veterans Disabled for Life Memorial
 Andrew W. Mellon Memorial Fountain
 Benjamin Banneker Circle
 Benjamin Banneker Park
 Brevet Lt. General Winfield Scott Hancock statue
 Columbus Circle
 Columbus Fountain – Union Station Plaza
 Daniel Webster Memorial
 District of Columbia War Memorial
 Doctor John Witherspoon statue
 Dupont Circle
 East Potomac Park including Hains Point
 Edmund Burke statue
 Edward J. Kelly Park
 Edward R. Murrow Park
 Farragut Square
 Franklin Delano Roosevelt Memorial Stone
 Franklin Square
 Freedom Plaza
 George Mason Memorial
 Henry Wadsworth Longfellow Memorial
 Holodomor Ukrainian Holocaust Memorial
 James Monroe Park
 John Ericsson Memorial
 National Law Enforcement Officers Memorial
 Logan Circle
 Mahatma Gandhi Memorial
 Martin Luther statue
 McPherson Square
 Memorial to Japanese-American Patriotism in World War II
 Milian Park
 Nuns of the Battlefield (Civil War Nurses Memorial)
 Pan American Annex grounds – located between Constitution and Virginia Avenues, NW and 18th and 19th Streets, NW
 Pulaski Park
 Judiciary Square Plaza
 Old Post Office Tower
 Pershing Park
 Rawlins Park
 Rigo Walled Park
 Samuel Gompers Memorial
 Samuel Hahnemann Monument
 Scott Circle
 Seaton Park
 Sheridan Circle
 Temperance Fountain and statue
 Southwest Waterfront Park (Titanic Memorial)
 Tomáš Garrigue Masaryk
 Statues of the Liberators
 Benito Juarez
 Bernardo de Gálvez
 Equestrian of Simón Bolívar
 General Jose de San Martin Memorial
 General José Gervasio Artigas
 Taras Shevchenko Memorial (Ukrainian Independence Park)
 Thomas Circle
 United States Navy Memorial
 Victims of Communism Memorial
 Vincent R. Sombrotto Memorial Park
 Walt Whitman Park
 Washington Circle
 West Potomac Park

References

External links

 
 National Mall Plan

 

1965 establishments in Washington, D.C.

Protected areas established in 1965

Washington, D.C.-related lists